Treason: Liberal Treachery from the Cold War to the War on Terrorism is a 2003 book by Ann Coulter. Three weeks after its release more than 500,000 copies were sold.

McCarthyism
In the book, Coulter argues U.S. Senator Joseph McCarthy was unfairly portrayed by the U.S. media as persecuting people for political reasons. Coulter alleges McCarthy correctly identified communist foreign spies in the United States.

In an interview with David Bowman, Coulter said that Joseph McCarthy is the deceased person she admires the most. Coulter claims in Treason that McCarthy was simply misunderstood and unappreciated, and that the Venona cables and other sources have vindicated him by showing there indeed were Soviet spies in the United States government. In continuing efforts to exculpate McCarthy, she wrote some columns attacking George Clooney's movie Good Night, and Good Luck, about television journalist Edward R. Murrow and McCarthy. She claims McCarthyism is inaccurately portrayed as destructive.

References

External links
 Book reviews
 Tailgunner Ann – by William F. Buckley, Jr.
A Conspiracy So Vast  – by Dorothy Rabinowitz
Has she no shame? – by Joe Conason

2003 non-fiction books
Books by Ann Coulter
Books critical of modern liberalism in the United States
War on Terror books
Books about the Cold War
English-language books